The Jurong Rock Caverns (JRC) (Chinese: 裕廊岛地下储油库, Malay: Gua Batu Simpanan Barang Mentah Jurong) is the first underground rock cavern for oil storage in Southeast Asia. It is owned by Jurong Town Corporation. The rock caverns were officially opened on 2 September 2014 by the third Prime Minister of Singapore, Lee Hsien Loong.

Located at a depth of  beneath Banyan Basin on Jurong Island, the  caverns, provide infrastructural support to companies on Jurong Island such as Shell, ExxonMobil and Chevron Philips, and meet the storage needs for liquid hydrocarbons such as crude oil, condensate, naphtha and gas oil.

The second phase is foreseen to double this capacity.

References

2014 establishments in Singapore
Jurong